West Green is a village in the Hartley Wintney parish of Hampshire, England. The villages lies 2 miles (3 km) from Hook, its nearest town.

Villages in Hampshire